Brachymystax savinovi is a salmonid fish species endemic to Markakol Lake and adjacent rivers in eastern Kazakhstan. It was formerly included in the more widespread species Brachymystax lenok (now known as the sharp-snouted lenok).

References

savinovi
Fish of Asia
Fish described in 1959